The Barbara Stanwyck Show is an American anthology drama television series which ran on NBC from September 1960 to September 1961. Barbara Stanwyck served as hostess, and starred in all but four of the half-hour productions. The four in which she did not star were actually pilot episodes of potential series programs which never materialized. Stanwyck won the Emmy Award in 1961 for Outstanding Performance by an Actress in a Series.

Three of the episodes in which Stanwyck starred were an attempt at spinning off a dramatic series of her own, in which she appeared as "Josephine Little", an American woman running an import-export shop in Hong Kong.

The series, produced at Desilu Studios, was directed by different directors, Robert Florey, Jacques Tourneur, Stuart Rosenberg. The Barbara Stanwyck Show lasted one season. It aired at 10 p.m. Eastern on Mondays opposite Jackie Cooper's military sitcom Hennesey on CBS and the second half of Gardner McKay's Adventures in Paradise on ABC.

The American Gas Association sponsored the program on alternate weeks.

Guest stars

Leon Ames
Dana Andrews
Michael Ansara
Lew Ayres
Ralph Bellamy
Milton Berle
James Best
Charles Bickford
Joan Blondell
Nesdon Booth
Edgar Buchanan
Spencer Chan
Joseph Cotten
Walter Coy
Yvonne Craig
Hume Cronyn
Robert Culp
Andy Devine
Dan Duryea
Richard Eastham
Buddy Ebsen
Elana Eden
Ross Elliott
Peter Falk
William Fawcett
Eduard Franz

Bruce Gordon
Virginia Gregg
Eloise Hardt
Dennis Hopper
Robert Horton
Julie London
John McGiver
Stephen McNally
Lee Marvin
Gerald Mohr
Vic Morrow
Jack Mullaney
Jack Nicholson
Lloyd Nolan
Susan Oliver
Doris Packer
James Philbrook
Amanda Randolph
Michael Rennie
Marion Ross
Penny Santon
Harold J. Stone
Gerald Oliver Smith
Stephen Talbot
Virginia Vincent
Anna May Wong

Production
11 episodes, The Mink Coat, Ironbark's Bridge, The Miraculous Journey of Tadpole Chan, Frightened Doll, The Choice, Sign of the Zodiac, Adventure on Happiness Street, The Golden Acres, Confession, Dragon by the Tail, Dear Charlie have been directed by Jacques Tourneur.

Home media
E1 Entertainment, formerly known as Koch Vision, and The Archive of American Television released Volume 1 of the series on DVD in the United States on October 13, 2009.  A second volume also a two-disc set was released on May 18, 2010.

References

External links
 

1960 American television series debuts
1961 American television series endings
1960s American anthology television series
1960s American drama television series
Black-and-white American television shows
English-language television shows
NBC original programming
Television series by CBS Studios